Eskifjörður (in original spelling), or Eskifjördur is a town and port in eastern Iceland with a large fishing industry. With a population of 1,043 it is one of the most populous towns in the municipality of Fjarðabyggð.

History
Eskifjörður had 302 inhabitants in 1901, 425 in 1910, 619 in 1920, 758 in 1930, 671 in 1940, 673 in  1950, 1741 in 1960, 936 in 1970 and 1 084 in 1981. It obtained the rights and privilegies of an official trading place (verslunastaður) as early as 1786 und was awarded municipal status (kaupstðurréttindi) on 10 April 1974. It developed into a booming community after Örum & Wulff, a powerful Danish trading company, had opened  a trading post in 1798. In 1802 Kjartan Þórlaksson, the first Icelandic merchant who was not a Dane, settled down in Eskifjörður and started a successful business.

Eskifjörður joined Neskaupstaður and Reyðarfjörður in 1998 to form the new municipality of Fjarðabyggð ("fjords-settlement").

Geography
The other villages composing the municipality are: Fáskrúðsfjörður (662 inh.), Mjóifjörður (35 inh.), Neskaupstaður (1,437 inh.), Reyðarfjörður (1,102 inh.) and Stöðvarfjörður (203 inh.).

Main sights
A sculpture by Ragnar Kjartansson is located along the main road in Eskifjördur, commemorating the mariners who drowned at sea.

The Maritime Museum of East Iceland is located in a commercial building, "Gamla búđ", which was built in 1816. The museum displays artefacts that illustrate the fishing and seafaring history of East Iceland. It also displays various reminders of local trade, industry and medicine from times past. The First Free Church in Iceland was built in Eskifjörður in 1884.

Eskifjörður has one of the most beautiful rare stone collections in Iceland, with thousands of polished, cut and original stones from all over the island, privately owned but visitable.

Notable people
Aðalsteinn Jónsson, business man and former CEO of Hraðfrystihús Eskifjarðar
Einar Bragi, poet
Eggert Jónsson, footballer
Þórólfur Guðnason, Chief Epidemiologist of the Icelandic Directorate of Health

References

External links

 Visit Eskifjordur tourist guide
 Visit Eskifjordur Facebook Fan page for tourist information around Eskifjordur
 Facebook Fan page about everything in Eskifjörður
 Eskifjörður page on Fjarðabyggð municipal website
Images of Eskifjörður on Flickr

Eskifjörður
Fjords of Iceland
Populated places in Eastern Region (Iceland)